Imelda Munster (born 24 February 1968) is an Irish Sinn Féin politician who has been a Teachta Dála (TD) for the Louth constituency since the 2016 general election.

She was elected to Louth County Council representing the Drogheda East local electoral area following the 2004 local elections and was re-elected in 2009 to both Drogheda Borough Council and Louth County Council.

She successfully contested the Louth constituency at 2016 general election, receiving 8,829 first preference votes (13.1%) and was re-elected at the 2020 general election receiving 17,203 first preference votes (24.34%).

Personal life
Munster lives with her husband Niall and two daughters in Melifont Park, Drogheda.

References

External links
Imelda Munster's page on the Sinn Féin website

1968 births
Living people
Members of the 32nd Dáil
Sinn Féin TDs (post-1923)
Local councillors in County Louth
Members of the 33rd Dáil
21st-century women Teachtaí Dála